Auraiya is a city and municipal board in Uttar Pradesh, India.

Auraiya may also refer to:
 Auraiya (Assembly constituency), a constituency of the Uttar Pradesh Legislative Assembly, India
 Auraiya, Nepal, a village
 Auraiya district, Uttar Pradesh, India
 Auraiya Thermal Power Station, Uttar Pradesh, India

See also